Thank You Very Little is a compilation by Screeching Weasel. It contains b-sides, rarities, and a live show. The title was taken from a line in the movie Caddyshack. Most of the second disc is taken from a show in Philadelphia from the band's 1993 tour.

Track listing
All songs written by Ben Weasel except where noted.

Disc 1
"I Hate Old Folks"
"Nothing Matters"
"Crawl"
"Someday"
"I Need Therapy"
"Slogans"
"I Wanna Be a Homosexual" (Ben Weasel/Dan Vapid/John Jughead)
"Crying in My Beer"
"Jeannie's Got a Problem With Her Uterus"
"Shirley's on Methadone"
"Amy Saw Me Looking at Her Boobs" (Ben Weasel/Joe King)
"27 Things I Wanna Do to You"
"Every Night"
"Totally"
"Nightbreed"
"Suzanne Is Getting Married"
"Waiting for Susie" (Ben Weasel/Dan Vapid)
"Lose the Dink"
"Stuck Out Here"
"Suspect Device" (Jake Burns/Gordon Ogilvie)
"Fuck You" (Gerry Hannah)
"The Prisoner" (Joe Keithley/C. Keighly)
"Can't Take It"
"My Own World"
"Tightrope"
"Dirt" (James Osterberg/Ron Asheton/Dave Alexander/Scott Asheton)
"You Are My Sunshine" (Jimmie Davis/Charles Mitchell)
"Anchor" (Masafumi Isobe/Kudo Tetsuya/Hiramoto Leona/Ben Weasel)

Disc 2
"I Love Beer"
"Around on You" (Ben Weasel/Dan Vapid)
"Squeaky Clean" (Ben Weasel/Dan Vapid)
"Electroshock Therapy"
"You're the Enemy"
"Intro"
"Slogans"
"Cindy's on Methadone"
"Teenage Freakshow" (Ben Weasel/Dan Vapid)
"Veronica Hates Me"
"I Was a High School Psychopath" (Dan Vapid)
"I Can See Clearly" (Johnny Nash)
"Joanie Loves Johnny" (Ben Weasel)
"Automatic Rejector" (John Jughead/Dan Panic/Johnny Personality/Dan Vapid/Ben Weasel)
"Supermarket Fantasy"
"Science of Myth"
"I'm Gonna Strangle You"
"Hey Suburbia" (Ben Weasel/John Jughead)
"Totally"
"Inside Out"
"Goodbye to You" (Ben Weasel/Dan Vapid)
"Guest List" (Ben Weasel/Dan Vapid)
"Eine Kleine Scheissemusic" (Ben Weasel/Dan Vapid)

Credits

Disc 1
Ben Weasel- Vocals, guitar on tracks 1–5, 15–21, 25, and 27-28
John Jughead- Guitar
Vinnie Bovine- Bass on tracks 1-2
Steve Cheese- Drums on tracks 1-2
Dan Vapid- Guitar on tracks 6-12, bass on tracks 13-14 and 18-19
Warren Fish- Bass on tracks 6-7
Johnny Personality- Bass on tracks 8-12, backing vocals on track 23
Dan Panic- Drums on tracks 8-19
Mike Dirnt- Bass on tracks 16-17
Mass Giorgini- Bass on tracks 17 and 20-28
Dan Lumley- Drums on tracks 20-28
Zac Damon- Guitar on tracks 22-24
Jesse Michaels- Guitar solo and backing vocals on track 27
Tracks 1-2 from 1986 Demo tape
Tracks 3-5 from 1989 Demo tape
Track 6 from There's A Fungus Amongus compilation
Track 7 from What Are You Pointing At? compilation
Tracks 8-9 from 1992 Demo tape
Tracks 10-12 outtakes from Wiggle
Tracks 13-14 outtakes from Anthem for a New Tomorrow
Track 15 outtake from How to Make Enemies and Irritate People
Tracks 16-17 from Suzanne Is Getting Married
Tracks 18-19 outtakes from Bark Like A Dog
Tracks 20–21, 26 from Jesus Hates You
Tracks 20-24 outtakes from Television City Dream
Tracks 25-28 outtakes from Emo

Disc 2
Ben Weasel- Vocals, guitar on tracks 2-22, piano on track 23
John Jughead- Guitar on tracks 1-23
Doug Ward- Guitar on track 1
Dan Vapid- Bass on tracks 1-22, piano on track 23
Brian Vermin- Drums on track 1
Dan Panic- Drums on tracks 2-22
Track 1 and 23 from 1989 live performance
Tracks 2-5 from 1993 band rehearsal
Tracks 6-22 from March 20, 1993 live performance

B-side compilation albums
2000 compilation albums
Screeching Weasel compilation albums
Lookout! Records compilation albums